Claudio Cesare Prandelli (born 19 August 1957) is an Italian football coach and former player. He was most recently head coach of Fiorentina.

Career

Player
Prandelli was a midfielder who moved from Atalanta to Juventus in 1979. His first game for Juventus was in the 1979–80 European Cup Winners' Cup against Raba ETO Győr. He played six seasons with Juventus, with his final game in the 1984–85 Coppa Italia against Milan.

In total, Prandelli played in 197 Serie A matches.

Manager

Early years as club coach
Prandelli began his managing career as youth team coach for Atalanta, achieving excellent results from 1990 to 1997, save for a seven-months parenthesis – from November 1993 to June 1994 – in which he served as caretaker for the first team, then relegated to Serie B. After a poor 1997–98 Serie A campaign as Lecce head coach ended in a sacking in January 1998, Prandelli headed Hellas Verona for two seasons, leading the gialloblu to an immediate promotion to Serie A, and then to a solid ninth-place finish the next year. He later spent two years with Parma.

Starting the 2004–05 season for Roma, he left the team because of personal problems involving his wife, with her being seriously ill.

Fiorentina
Prandelli joined Fiorentina as manager in the summer of 2005. His first season in Tuscany proved to be a huge success, as Prandelli transformed Fiorentina from relegation strugglers into a team worthy of a UEFA Champions League spot, finishing the season in fourth place. Unfortunately for Fiorentina and Prandelli, however, as a result of the Calciopoli match-fixing scandal, Fiorentina was stripped of its Champions League spot and started the 2006–07 season in Serie A with a 15-point deduction.

The next year, despite the points deduction, Prandelli was able to guide Fiorentina to a sixth-place finish in Serie A (with the same point tally as fifth placed Palermo), securing UEFA Cup qualification for the 2007–08 season. The team performed well in the competition, losing in a penalty shootout against Rangers in the semi-final. In Serie A, the team finished fourth after winning a long race against Milan, earning a ticket to participate in the 2008–09 Champions League following a season in which his wife died.

For his work in the 2007–08 season, Prandelli was awarded the Serie A Coach of the Year at the "Oscar del calcio" awards in early 2009. He later managed to get Fiorentina into the group phase after defeating Slavia Prague in the third qualifying round, and also guided Fiorentina to another fourth place spot, this time just pipping Genoa (who ended the season with the same points as Fiorentina, but were classified at fifth due to head-to-head results) and a second consecutive participation in the Champions League qualifying rounds. After the departure of Milan manager Carlo Ancelotti, Prandelli's tenure as Fiorentina became the longest of all incumbent Serie A managers.

In 2009, Prandelli surpassed Fulvio Bernardini as the longest-serving manager in Fiorentina history, and guided the viola to a historic qualification in the round of 16 of the 2009–10 Champions League, where it was eliminated by Bayern Munich (which later went on to reach the final) through the away goals rule. Prandelli, however, did not manage to repeat such successes at the domestic stage, with things being made even more complex by his key player Adrian Mutu being suspended due to doping-related issues. Fiorentina ended the 2009–10 Serie A in 11th position, far removed from the top sides in the league.

Italy national team

On 20 May 2010, Fiorentina confirmed that Prandelli was given permission to hold talks with Italian Football Federation (FIGC) president Giancarlo Abete to replace Marcello Lippi as head coach of the Italy national team after the 2010 FIFA World Cup. On 30 May, the FIGC publicly announced that Prandelli will take over from Lippi at the head of the Azzurri after the World Cup. His official debut arrived on 10 August 2010 in a friendly match against the Ivory Coast at the Boleyn Ground, London, finishing in a 0–1 defeat.

Then, during the UEFA Euro 2012 qualifiers, Italy came back from behind to defeat Estonia 2–1. Italy's match against Serbia was plagued by crowd trouble and UEFA subsequently awarded Italy a 3–0 victory, putting them in pole position of their group. On 25 March 2011, Italy recorded a 1–0 win over Slovenia to secure top spot in the qualification table. Before the Slovenia game, Prandelli said, "The moment has come for us to have faith in the former greats of our football and learn from them ... My instruction is to work, work, work and I sincerely believe in rebuilding." Although preparations for the Euro 2012 finals in Poland and Ukraine were affected by domestic match-rigging scandals, Prandelli succeeded in restoring honour to the national team after six years of relative famine by unexpectedly guiding it to the final. After coming second in the group stage while adopting a 3–5–2 system (with 1–1 draws against Spain and Croatia and a 2–0 win over the Republic of Ireland), the team switched to a more attractive, offensive-minded, possession-based approach, which used a 4–4–2 diamond; following the tactical switch, Italy dominated a goalless encounter against England won by a penalty shootout, and then contrived a striking 2–1 defeat of Germany in which Prandelli's special protégé Mario Balotelli scored twice. Despite losing 4–0 to Spain in the final, Prandelli was able to bring the team back to Italy amid popular applause to receive the personal compliments of President of Italy Giorgio Napolitano at an official reception in the Quirinal Palace.

After comfortably guiding the Italian team to qualification to the 2014 World Cup, in March 2014 it was revealed Prandelli had agreed a two-year contract extension that would keep him in charge until Euro 2016. On 24 June 2014, he resigned as Italy manager after a 1–0 defeat against Uruguay which eliminated Italy from the World Cup in the group stage.

Galatasaray
On 3 July 2014, Prandelli became the manager of Galatasaray taking over from the previous fellow Italian coach Roberto Mancini, signing a two-year contract. He would only spend 147 days as manager, however, as he was sacked on 28 November 2014. His league performance was certainly not bad: in ten weeks his team managed to get six wins, one draw and three losses, landing at third place in the Süper Lig, one point behind Fenerbahçe and Beşiktaş. The team under Prandelli, however, had one of its worst seasons in the Champions League, with two 4–1 losses to Arsenal, and 4–0 and 4–1 losses to Borussia Dortmund, ending the team with one points and −12 goal difference in six games. Prandelli's statement that "the Turkish league is our priority" was not well received by the fans and the club board, as Galatasaray is often seen as the "European team" of Turkey, being the most successful club in European tournaments. Prandelli's tactics and player choices were also heavily criticized in the media, as he tried different lineups in 16 games that he managed. His successor, Hamza Hamzaoğlu, led the team to both league and cup titles. Players declared their discontent about working with Prandelli several times in the media.

Valencia
On 28 September 2016, Prandelli was appointed manager of Spanish La Liga club Valencia. He resigned after only ten games on 30 December 2016.

Al-Nasr
On 25 May 2017, Prandelli was appointed manager of Emirates Arabian Gulf League club Al-Nasr Dubai.

Genoa
On 7 December 2018, Prandelli was appointed as Genoa manager. His contract was terminated on 20 June 2019.

Return to Fiorentina
On 9 November 2020, Prandelli returned to Fiorentina as manager following the sacking of Giuseppe Iachini. He resigned on 23 March 2021 following a 2–3 home loss to AC Milan, declaring on a public statement his decision to be motivated by personal reasons and a feeling of distress, and also hinting at the fact it might have been his final role as a coach in his career.

Personal life
Prandelli is a widower who was married to Manuela Caffi, a woman he had met in his hometown of Orzinuovi when he was 18 and she 15. They married in 1982, with footballers Antonio Cabrini and Domenico Pezzolla witnessing the event, and they had two children named Carolina and Nicolò. In 2001, Prandelli's wife was diagnosed with breast cancer; her worsening health conditions led Prandelli to resign from his coaching post at Roma only days after his signing. After a short recovery, her conditions worsened and she died on 26 November 2007 in Florence. On 29 November, Fiorentina travelled to Athens to play Greek side AEK Athens, with Prandelli's assistant Gabriele Pin deputizing for him. The Fiorentina team attended Prandelli's wife's funeral along with her personal friends. The team was shaken by the turn of events.

Prandelli's son Nicolò has also embarked on an off-pitch football career, having been chosen as a fitness coach by Parma in 2009, and then by the Italy national team during the buildup to the Euro 2012 finals.

Prandelli is a devout Catholic. As of 2010, he has been in a relationship with Novella Benini. Prandelli has spoken out against homophobia and racism in football; in 2012, he wrote a preface to a new book on homosexuality in sport by Alessandro Cecchi Paone and Flavio Pagano which stated, "Homophobia is racism and it is indispensable that we make further steps to look after all aspects of individuals living their own lives, including sporting figures, ... In the world of football and of sport in general there is still a taboo around homosexuality. Everyone ought to live freely with themselves, their desires and their sentiments. We must all work for a sporting culture that respects the individual in every manifestation of his truth and freedom. Hopefully soon some players will come out."

Managerial statistics

Honours

Player
Cremonese
Serie C: 1976–77

Juventus
Serie A: 1980–81, 1981–82, 1983–84
Coppa Italia: 1982–83
European Cup: 1984–85
UEFA Cup Winners' Cup: 1983–84
UEFA Super Cup: 1984

Manager
Hellas Verona
Serie B: 1998–99

Italy
UEFA European Football Championship Runners-up: 2012
FIFA Confederations Cup Third Place: 2013

Individual
Panchina d'Oro: 2005–06, 2006–07
Serie A Coach of the Year: 2007–08
Premio internazionale Giacinto Facchetti: 2009
Enzo Bearzot Award: 2011
Fiorentina All-time XI (Manager)

References

External links

Cesare Prandelli at soccerway

1957 births
Living people
Sportspeople from the Province of Brescia
Footballers from Lombardy
Italian footballers
Association football midfielders
U.S. Cremonese players
Atalanta B.C. players
Juventus F.C. players
Serie A players
Serie B players
Serie C players
Italian football managers
Atalanta B.C. non-playing staff
Atalanta B.C. managers
U.S. Lecce managers
Hellas Verona F.C. managers
Venezia F.C. managers
Parma Calcio 1913 managers
A.S. Roma managers
ACF Fiorentina managers
Italy national football team managers
Galatasaray S.K. (football) managers
Valencia CF managers
Al-Nasr SC (Dubai) managers
Genoa C.F.C. managers
Serie B managers
Serie A managers
Süper Lig managers
La Liga managers
UAE Pro League managers
UEFA Euro 2012 managers
2013 FIFA Confederations Cup managers
2014 FIFA World Cup managers
Italian expatriate football managers
Italian expatriate sportspeople in Turkey
Italian expatriate sportspeople in Spain
Italian expatriate sportspeople in the United Arab Emirates
Expatriate football managers in Turkey
Expatriate football managers in Spain
Expatriate football managers in the United Arab Emirates
Italian Roman Catholics